John Atwater was an Irish merchant and Mayor of Cork known for his support of Perkin Warbeck the pretender to the English Crown. Atwater was a prominent Yorkist supporter opposed to the rule of the Tudor Dynasty led by Henry VII.

After Warbeck's arrival in Cork in 1491, Atwater was instrumental in persuading him to impersonate Richard, Duke of York. Richard had likely been executed in the Tower of London several years before, but there remained widespread support for his family in Ireland. His impersonation enjoyed great success for several years and travelled across Europe securing recognition from various monarchs. Atwater may have participated in his unsuccessful 1495 Siege of Waterford.

In 1496 he was excluded from a general pardon of Warbeck's supporters issued by the new Lord Deputy of Ireland, the Earl of Kildare. He accompanied Warbeck on his invasion of England in 1497, which ended in defeat. Captured by Tudor forces he was held in the Tower of London. In 1499 he was tried for treason at Whitehall and sentenced to be hanged, drawn and quartered. On 23 November he was taken along with Warbeck to Tyburn and executed.

References

Bibliography
 John Duncan Mackie. The Earlier Tudors, 1485-1558. Clarendon Press, 1952.

1499 deaths
People from Cork (city)
15th-century Irish politicians